The Temperatibacteraceae are a family of bacteria.

References

Caulobacterales